Béthonsart is a commune in the Pas-de-Calais department in the Hauts-de-France region in northern France.

Geography
A small farming village located 12 miles (20 km) northwest of Arras on the D74.

Population

Sights
 A seventeenth-century farmhouse.
 The church of St. Elizabeth, dating from the sixteenth century

See also
Communes of the Pas-de-Calais department

References

Communes of Pas-de-Calais